Justice Strong may refer to:

National courts
 Samuel Henry Strong, chief justice of Canada
 William Strong (Pennsylvania judge), associate justice of the Supreme Court of Pennsylvania, and of the Supreme Court of the United States

State courts
 Selah B. Strong, justice of the New York Supreme Court and ex officio a judge of the New York Court of Appeals
 Simeon Strong, associate justice of the Massachusetts Supreme Judicial Court.
 Theron R. Strong, justice of the New York Supreme Court and ex officio a judge of the New York Court of Appeals
 William Strong (Oregon judge), associate justice of the Oregon Supreme Court